Elphas Sabelo Ginindza (born 23 August 1967) is a Swazi long-distance runner. He competed in the men's marathon at the 1992 Summer Olympics.

References

External links
 

1967 births
Living people
Athletes (track and field) at the 1992 Summer Olympics
Swazi male long-distance runners
Swazi male marathon runners
Olympic athletes of Eswatini
Athletes (track and field) at the 1994 Commonwealth Games
Athletes (track and field) at the 1998 Commonwealth Games
Commonwealth Games competitors for Eswatini
Place of birth missing (living people)